The Lo Nuestro Award for Pop Group or Duo of the Year  is an award presented annually by American network Univision. It was first awarded in 1989 and has been given annually since. The accolade was established to recognize the most talented performers of Latin music. The nominees and winners were originally selected by a voting poll conducted among program directors of Spanish-language radio stations in the United States and also based on chart performance on Billboard Latin music charts, with the results being tabulated and certified by the accounting firm Deloitte. At the present time, the winners are selected by the audience through an online survey. The trophy awarded is shaped in the form of a treble clef.

The award was first presented to Cuban-American band Gloria Estefan and Miami Sound Machine. Mexican group Camila holds the record for the most awards, winning on five occasions out of seven nominations. Mexican duo Sin Bandera, group Los Bukis (once as Marco Antonio Solís and Los Bukis), and rock band Maná, won in three ceremonies each. Only two duets have won the award: Juan Gabriel and Rocío Dúrcal in 1998 and Shakira and Alejandro Sanz in 2006. In 2019, American ensemble CNCO became the most recent recipients of the award.

Winners and nominees
Listed below are the winners of the award for each year, as well as the other nominees for the majority of the years awarded.

See also
 Grammy Award for Best Latin Pop Album
 Latin Grammy Award for Best Pop Album by a Duo or Group with Vocals
 Los Premios MTV Latinoamérica for Best Group or Duet

References

Pop Group
Pop music awards
Awards established in 1989